Catching Fire: How Cooking Made Us Human is a 2009 book by British primatologist Richard Wrangham, published by Profile Books in England, and Basic Books in the USA. It argues the hypothesis that cooking food was an essential element in the physiological evolution of human beings. It was shortlisted for the 2010 Samuel Johnson Prize.

History of the idea
Eighteenth-century writers noted already that "people cooked their meat, rather than eating it raw like animals". Oliver Goldsmith considered that "of all other animals, we spend the least time in eating; this is one of the great distinctions between us and the brute creation". In 1999, Wrangham published the first version of the hypothesis in Current Anthropology. A short outline of the hypothesis was presented by John Allman (2000) presumably based upon Wrangham (1999).

Overview
Humans (species in the genus Homo) are the only animals that cook their food, and Wrangham argues Homo erectus emerged about two million years ago as a result of this unique trait. Cooking had profound evolutionary effect because it increased food efficiency, which allowed human ancestors to spend less time foraging, chewing, and digesting. H. erectus developed a smaller, more efficient digestive tract, which freed up energy to enable larger brain growth. Wrangham also argues that cooking and control of fire generally affected species development by providing warmth and helping to fend off predators, which helped human ancestors adapt to a ground-based lifestyle. Wrangham points out that humans are highly evolved for eating cooked food and cannot maintain reproductive fitness with raw food.

Reception

Positive
Book reviewers gave Catching Fire generally positive reviews. The New York Times called it "a rare thing: a slim book - the text itself is a mere 207 pages - that contains serious science, yet is related in direct, no-nonsense prose", and the Telegraph (UK) called it "that rare thing, an exhilarating science book".

Negative
Critics of the cooking hypothesis question whether archaeological evidence supports the view that cooking fires began long enough ago to confirm Wrangham's findings. The traditional explanation is that human ancestors scavenged carcasses for high-quality food that preceded the evolutionary shift to smaller guts and larger brains.

See also
 Control of fire by early humans
 Evolution of the brain

References

Further reading
 Catching Fire: How Cooking Made Us Human by Richard Wrangham: review by Simon Ings in the Telegraph (4 October 2009)
 How cooking makes you a man. Interview by Sarah Karnasiewicz on salon.com (29 July 2009)
 Review by Pat Shipman in Nature 459, 1059-1060 (25 June 2009)
 Frances D. Burton (2009) Fire: The Spark That Ignited Human Evolution, University of New Mexico Press, 

Anthropology books
Profile Books books
2009 non-fiction books